The Alienist is an American period drama television series based on the 1994 novel of the same name by Caleb Carr. The ten-episode limited series first aired on TNT as a sneak peek on January 21, 2018, before its official premiere on January 22, 2018, airing until March 26, 2018. The series stars Daniel Brühl, Luke Evans, and Dakota Fanning as an ad hoc team assembled in mid-1890s New York City to investigate a serial killer who is murdering street children. The series incorporates fact with fiction by including the characters that are historical figures, such as Theodore Roosevelt, who held the post of police commissioner from 1895 to 1897. On August 16, 2018, TNT ordered a sequel series based upon the 1997 follow-up novel The Angel of Darkness. The second season, titled The Alienist: Angel of Darkness, premiered on July 19, 2020, and aired through August 9, 2020.

Premise 
The first season is set in 1896, when a series of gruesome murders of boy prostitutes has gripped New York City. Newly appointed police commissioner Teddy Roosevelt calls upon Dr. Laszlo Kreizler, a criminal psychiatrist, and John Moore, a newspaper illustrator, to conduct the investigation in secret. Joining them in the probe is Sara Howard, Roosevelt's headstrong secretary, as well as twin brothers Marcus and Lucius Isaacson, both detective sergeants in the New York City Police Department (NYPD).

The team finds opposition within the NYPD, primarily from Captain Connor and the recently retired Chief Byrnes, both of whom are more committed to protecting the reputations of New York's high society than they are to finding the perpetrators of the crimes; as well as from the working poor and lower class citizens who distrust them for being outsiders.

In the second season, set a year later, Sara has opened a private detective agency. She, Kreizler, and Moorenow a New York Times reporterteam up to find the Spanish consul's kidnapped infant daughter. Their investigation puts them on a path of another elusive killer, while showcasing institutional corruption, income inequality, yellow journalism, and the role of women in 1890s society.

Cast

Main 

 Daniel Brühl as Laszlo Kreizler, an alienist (or psychiatrist) who has focused recently on children suffering from mental illnesses, called upon by his former Harvard classmate Theodore Roosevelt to try to understand the psychology behind grisly child murders. He is Hungarian and comes from a well-off family. He lives alone save for his maid, valet, and stable boy. He has a lame arm, and frequently seeks out the insight of former patients and criminals for help with his investigations and research.
 Luke Evans as John Schuyler Moore, a New York Times cartoonist and illustrator, as well as a society man who attended Harvard with Kreizler and Roosevelt. He lives with his grandmother, and is estranged from his father following the drowning death of his brother. He is handsome and charming, but is an alcoholic and frequenter of brothels, and remains unmarried after his fiancée left him for another man. Like Roosevelt, he has known Sara since she was young.
 Brian Geraghty as Theodore Roosevelt (season 1), the newly appointed commissioner of the NYPD. He is portrayed as commanding respect from certain people, but remains malleable by society's most venerable as well as veteran NYPD officers. He attended Harvard with Kreizler and Moore, both of whom he calls upon to mount a secret, parallel investigation into the child murders. He employs Sara Howard as his secretary, having known her father, and thinks highly of her.
 Robert Ray Wisdom as Cyrus Montrose, Kreizler's valet whom he employed after testifying on Cyrus' behalf during a murder trial
 Douglas Smith as Marcus Isaacson, a young Jewish detective sergeant with the NYPD whom Roosevelt enlists to work with Kreizler, Moore, and Howard. He is Lucius' twin brother, and like his brother, is well versed in science and general crime scene investigation. He becomes involved with a Jewish socialist.
 Matthew Shear as Lucius Isaacson, Marcus' twin brother and another detective sergeant with the NYPD. He is much more cautious and restrained than Marcus, and eager to utilize the latest scientific techniques to solve crimes.
 Q'orianka Kilcher as Mary Palmer (season 1), Kreizler's maid. Like Cyrus, she was taken in by Kreizler after she was acquitted for murder. She is mute and uses sign language to communicate, and has an affection for Kreizler.
 Matt Lintz (season 1) and Dominic Herman-Day (season 2) as Stevie Taggert, a youthful ward and stable boy of Kreizler's who often assists Cyrus, and gets involved in the team's investigation
 Dakota Fanning as Sara Howard, a young society woman who becomes Roosevelt's secretary and the first woman employed by the NYPD. She spent time in a sanitarium after the death of her father, whom Roosevelt and Moore both knew. She is composed and determined to not allow her male colleagues to disparage her. She gets involved with the team as a liaison between Roosevelt and Kreizler and Moore. By the start of the second season, she has left the NYPD and opened her own private detective agency. The character is loosely based upon the story of Isabella Goodwin, New York's first female detective.
 Rosy McEwen as Libby Hatch (season 2), a young nurse at the Lying In Hospital
 Melanie Field as Bitsy Sussman (season 2), Sara's assistant at the detective agency

Recurring 
 Ted Levine as Thomas F. Byrnes, a retired police chief who steers Connor toward protecting the rich and wealthy from being persecuted for their crimes and indiscretions
 Martin McCreadie as Doyle, a police sergeant who works with Connor and is promoted to captain following Connor's departure from the NYPD

In season 1
 David Wilmot as Captain Connor, an Irish police officer who dislikes Roosevelt and who tries to subvert the team's investigations at every possible turn
 Antonio Magro as Paul Kelly, a mobster who runs a brothel frequented by high society men
 Jackson Gann as Joseph, a young boy who works at a brothel and who endears himself to Moore
 Michael Ironside as J.P. Morgan, a financier and banker. He uses Connor and Byrnes as his muscle to enforce protecting his fellow members of high society.
 Sean Young as Mrs. Van Bergen, the matriarch of the fictional van Bergen family. She is generally unperturbed by rumors about her son's actions, but nonetheless is compelled by Byrnes to take action to protect him.
 Josef Altin as Willem Van Bergen, a young man who preys on prepubescent boys. He suffers from syphilis.
 Peter McRobbie as William Lafayette Strong, the mayor of New York City from 1895 to 1897. He echoes Morgan and Byrnes' concerns for the city's upper crust.
 Bill Heck as John Beecham, a former Plains resident now living in New York

In season 2
 Matt Letscher as William Randolph Hearst, the editor of the New York Journal
 Michael McElhatton as Dr. Markoe, director of the Lying In Hospital
 Heather Goldenhersh as Matron, the head nurse at the Lying In Hospital
 Emily Barber as Violet Hayward, John's fiancée, who is Hearst's goddaughter
 Bruna Cusí as Señora Isabella Linares, the Spanish mother of a missing baby
 Brittany Marie Batchelder as Joanna Crawford, Cyrus's niece, a trained reporter who runs a seedy bar
 Georgia Lowe as Milly, another assistant to Sara at the agency
 Diego Martín as Narciso Linares, the Spanish ambassador-general
 Demetri Goritsas as Bernie Peterson, John's editor at The New York Times
 Frederick Schmidt as Goo Goo Knox, a street criminal who is Libby's lover
 Lara Pulver as Karen Stratten, a professor of psychology with interests similar to Kreizler's
 Gavin O'Connor as Murphy, a detective at the NYPD
 Peter Coonan as Ding Dong, a henchman of Goo Goo Knox.

Production

Development 
In April 2015, it was reported that Paramount Television would adapt The Alienist as an event television series in partnership with Anonymous Content. Paramount also announced that Eric Roth had come on board the project as an executive producer, as had Hossein Amini as both writer for the series and executive producer. It also announced that Cary Fukunaga would direct all the episodes and serve as an executive producer.

In May 2015, it was reported that TNT had made a deal to produce the series at $5million per episode. In July 2015, writer and director John Sayles announced on his blog that he was joining the series as a writer. On July 21, 2015, Caleb Carr made an announcement that he was coming on board the series as a consulting producer.

In September 2016, director Jakob Verbruggen replaced Fukunaga as director due to scheduling conflicts, though Fukunaga remained an executive producer.

Casting 
On November 28, 2016, it was reported that Daniel Brühl was cast as Dr. Laszlo Kreizler and Luke Evans as John Moore. Dakota Fanning was later cast as Sara Howard on January 14, 2017. On February 8, 2017, it was reported that Robert Wisdom was cast as Cyrus Montrose and Q'orianka Kilcher as Mary Palmer. Matt Lintz was cast as Stevie Taggert on February 15, 2017. On February 17, 2017, it was reported that Matthew Shear joined the cast as Lucius Isaacson. Douglas Smith was cast as Marcus Isaacson and Ted Levine as Thomas F. Byrnes on February 28, 2017. It was reported that Emanuela Postacchini was cast as Flora on March 17, 2017. On April 19, 2017, it was reported that Brian Geraghty was cast as Theodore Roosevelt.

Episodes

Season 1 (2018)

Season 2: Angel of Darkness (2020)

Broadcast 
International rights for the series were acquired by Netflix.

Reception

Critical response 
On review aggregator Rotten Tomatoes, the first season has an approval rating of 67% based on 78 reviews, with an average rating of 6.86/10; the site's consensuses states, "The Alienist boasts an impressive cast and superb production design, but a sluggish pace and too many tropes keep it from truly standing out in an overcrowded genre." On Metacritic, the first season has a weighted average score of 61 out of 100, based on 26 critics, indicating "generally favorable reviews".

In the second season, Rotten Tomatoes has an approval rating of 81% based on 16 reviews, with an average rating of 7.03/10; the site's consensuses states, "Tense and thrilling, if not terribly distinct, Angel of Darkness takes The Alienist in a darker direction while giving the superb Dakota Fanning more time to shine." On Metacritic, the second season has a weighted average score of 55 out of 100, based on 5 critics, indicating "mixed or average reviews".

Ratings

Overall 
 

| link2             = The Alienist (TV series)#Season 2 (2020)
| episodes2         = 8
| start2            = 
| end2              = 
| startrating2      = 1.33
| endrating2        = 0.95
| viewers2          = |2}} 
}}

Season 1

Season 2

Accolades

Notes

References

External links 
 

2010s American drama television series
2018 American television series debuts
2020 American television series endings
English-language television shows
Fictional portrayals of the New York City Police Department
2010s American LGBT-related drama television series
Television shows based on American novels
Television series by Anonymous Content
Television series by Studio T
Television shows filmed in Hungary
Television series set in the 1890s
TNT (American TV network) original programming
Television series by Paramount Television